The National Association (formally, the National Base Ball Association) was a professional baseball league that played during the 1879 and 1880 seasons. While not considered a major league, it operated before the formal establishment of minor league baseball. It should not be confused with the National Association of Professional Base Ball Players, the first fully-professional sports league in baseball, which operated several years prior.

History
The National Association originated in March 1879, taking National Base Ball Association its formal name. Newspapers of the era referred to it more succinctly as the National Contest or National Championship, not to be confused with the National League, which was known simply as the League.

The National Association was essentially a continuation of the International Association for Professional Base Ball Players, which had lost its final Canadian team.

1879
Teams from nine cities competed during the  season: Teams of this era were commonly referred to simply by their city, such as "the Holyokes" or "the Worcesters".
 Albany, New York (known as the "Blue Stockings")
 Holyoke, Massachusetts
 Manchester, New Hampshire
 New Bedford, Massachusetts
 Rochester, New York (known as the "Hop Bitters")
 Springfield, Massachusetts
 Utica, New York (known as the "Pent Ups")
 Washington, D.C. (known as the "Nationals")
 Worcester, Massachusetts (known as the "Grays")

Standings published in early October 1879, with the season "regarded as virtually closed", were:

1880
Teams from four cities competed during the  season:
 Albany, New York
 Baltimore, Maryland
 Rochester, New York (known as the "Hop Bitters")
 Washington, D.C. (known as the "Nationals")

The season began on May 1, with Albany and Washington playing to a 4–4 draw in 11 innings in Albany. Rochester did not join the association until June. By early August, Baltimore had dropped out, with records of contests played between the remaining three teams published as:

Games were played as late as the first week in September, with Washington defeating Rochester, 4–2, in a game played in Baltimore on September 2.

References

External links
League history at Baseball-Reference.com

Sports leagues established in 1879
Sports leagues disestablished in 1880
1879 establishments in the United States
1880 disestablishments in the United States
Defunct minor baseball leagues in the United States